Harry Ledger (born July ) is an English rugby union player for the Premiership side Exeter Chiefs. He also played for the England U19 Rugby Team. He plays as a flanker. Ledger attended Whitgift School.

References

1994 births
Living people
English rugby union players
Exeter Chiefs players
People educated at Whitgift School
Rugby union players from Greater London